is a Japanese former footballer who played as a forward. He played for Japan national team.

Club career
Nishizawa was born in Shizuoka on 18 June 1976. After graduating from Shimizu Higashi High School, he joined Cerezo Osaka in 1995. He moved to Spanish club Espanyol in December 2000. In July 2001, he moved to English club Bolton Wanderers. During his brief spell playing Bolton Wanderers, he is best remembered for scoring a dramatic late equaliser against Walsall in the League Cup. In 2002, he returned to Cerezo Osaka was relegated to J2 League from 2002. The club won the 2nd place in 2002 and was promoted to J1 League. In 2006, the club was relegated to J2 League. He moved to his local club Shimizu S-Pulse in 2007. He returned to Cerezo Osaka in 2009 and he retired end of 2009 season.

International career
On 21 May 1997, Nishizawa debuted for Japan national team against South Korea. Although he played four games and scored two goals at 1998 World Cup qualification in 1997, he was not selected Japan for 1998 World Cup. In 2000, he played for Japan for the first time in three years. At 2000 Asian Cup in October, he played all six games and scored five goals. Japan won the champions. At 2001 Confederations Cup, he also played four games and scored one goal. Japan achieved second place. He was selected Japan for 2002 World Cup and played one game. This match was his last game for Japan. He played 29 games and scored 10 goals for Japan until 2002.

Career statistics

Club

International

Scores and results list Japan's goal tally first, score column indicates score after each Nishizawa goal.

Honours
Japan
 FIFA Confederations Cup runner-up: 2001
 AFC Asian Cup: 2000

Individual
 J1 League Best Eleven: 2000

References

External links

Japan National Football Team Database

1976 births
Living people
Association football people from Shizuoka Prefecture
Japanese footballers
Japan international footballers
Japanese expatriate footballers
Japanese expatriate sportspeople in England
Japanese expatriate sportspeople in the Netherlands
Japanese expatriate sportspeople in Spain
Expatriate footballers in the Netherlands
Expatriate footballers in Spain
Expatriate footballers in England
J1 League players
J2 League players
La Liga players
Cerezo Osaka players
FC Volendam players
RCD Espanyol footballers
Bolton Wanderers F.C. players
Shimizu S-Pulse players
2000 AFC Asian Cup players
2001 FIFA Confederations Cup players
2002 FIFA World Cup players
AFC Asian Cup-winning players
Association football forwards